Konstantīns Konstantinovs (June 6, 1978 – October 28, 2018) was a Latvian powerlifter of russian descent.

Powerlifting career
Konstantinovs won the 2002 WPC Junior World Powerlifting Championships and the 2003 GPC World Powerlifting Championships both in the  weight class.

Konstantinovs finished third at the 2010 Champions Battle Raw Deadlift Challenge behind 3 time WPC World Champion and 2009 WPC Raw World Champion Andrey Belyaev and popular Russian strongman/Olympic weightlifter Mikhail Koklyaev on June 25, 2010 in Arhangelsk, Russia.

Konstantinovs won the 2011 WPC Raw World Powerlifting Championships title on Nov. 18, 2011 in Riga, Latvia in the  weight class with a  total. He also placed third at the 2009 WPC Raw World Championships in Rostov-na-Donu, Russia.

Personal life and death
Konstantinovs worked as a professional bodyguard to earn his living.

On October 28, 2018, it was reported that Konstantinovs died at the age of 40 due to unspecified causes.

Personal Powerlifting Records
done in non-official competition (WPC/GPC)
 Raw Squat no knee wraps - 705.5 lbs (320.0 kg) @275 lb (125 kg) class
 Raw Squat with knee wraps - 738.5 lbs (335.0 kg) @308 lb (140 kg) class
 Raw Bench Press without belt - 584.2 lbs (265.0 kg) @275 lb (125 kg) class
 Equipped Deadlift with power suit - 948.0 lbs (430.0 kg) @275 lb (125 kg) class
 Raw Deadlift - 904.2 lbs (411.0 kg) @275 lb (125 kg) class
 Raw Deadlift without belt - 939.2 lbs (426.0 kg) @308 lb (140 kg) class 
→ current all-time raw (unequipped) deadlift world records in the 308lb and 275lb class (open and drug-tested)
 Raw Powerlifting Total no knee wraps - 2171.6 lbs (705.5/584.2/881.9) @275 lb class/985.0 kg (320.0/265.0/400.0) @125 kg class
 Raw Powerlifting Total with knee wraps - 2217.9 lbs (727.5/551.2/939.2) @308 lb class/1006.0 kg (330.0/250.0/426.0) @140 kg class
→ current all-time "drug-tested" raw (unequipped) powerlifting total world records in the 308lb and 275lb class

References

1978 births
2018 deaths
Latvian powerlifters
Latvian strength athletes
Place of death missing
Latvian people of Russian descent
Sportspeople from Liepāja